Oxylides feminina is a butterfly in the family Lycaenidae. It is found in Uganda, the Democratic Republic of the Congo (Sankuru, Lualaba, Shaba, Maniema and Kivu) and north-western Zambia.

References

Butterflies described in 1904
Theclinae